Gypo  is a 2005 independent film written and directed by Jan Dunn. Its story details the breakdown of a family in a small town in Britain, told in three narratives. Within a structured screenplay the dialogue throughout was improvised.

Although the movement was dissolved in 2005, the filmmakers continued to develop independent and experimental films using or influenced the concept, which being the first film made in the post-Dogme 95 movement.

Plot summary
The film is shown through the eyes of the three main characters; Paul and Helen, a married couple, and Tasha, a teenage refugee. It shows how the family falls apart under the strain of unexpected emotions.

Production
The production filmed entirely in Thanet in Kent at a variety of locations including East Kent College, Kingsgate Bay, Margate, Pegwell Bay, Port of Ramsgate, Ramsgate, Royal Harbour Hotel and the Wig & Pen pub.

Cast
 Pauline McLynn as Helen
 Paul McGann as Paul
 Chloe Sirene as Tasha
 Rula Lenska as Irina
 Tamzin Dunstone as Kelly
 Tom Stuart as Darren
 Barry Latchford as Jimmy
 Olegar Fedoro as Tasha's Father
 Freddie Connor as Tasha's Husband
 Josef Altin as Michael
 Ashley McGuire as Penny

Awards
 British Independent Film Awards  Best Achievement in Production
 San Francisco Gay and Lesbian Film Festival  Best First Feature

Plus two other nominations and Special Mention at Torino International Gay and Lesbian Film Festival

References

review 2006 at Guardian

External links
 Gypo at the Internet Movie Database
 Gypo at Rotten Tomatoes 

2005 films
2005 drama films
British drama films
Dogme 95 films
Fiction with unreliable narrators
Films about racism
Films about prostitution in the United Kingdom
Films set in Kent
Lesbian-related films
Margate
British nonlinear narrative films
Films about dysfunctional families
Bisexuality-related films
LGBT-related drama films
2005 LGBT-related films
2000s English-language films
2000s British films